Ojokojo Torunarigha (born 12 March 1970) is a Nigerian former professional footballer who played as a forward for German club Chemnitzer FC between 1991 and 1995. He also played international football for Nigeria, and later became a coach at Hertha BSC. His sons Junior and Jordan are also footballers.

References

1970 births
Living people
Nigerian footballers
Association football forwards
Nigeria international footballers
Chemnitzer FC players
2. Bundesliga players
Nigerian expatriate footballers
Nigerian expatriate sportspeople in Germany
Expatriate footballers in Germany